Champmartin is a village in the district of Avenches in the canton of Vaud, Switzerland.

On January 1, 2002, the municipality Champmartin merged with Cudrefin under the name Cudrefin.

References

Villages in the canton of Vaud
Former municipalities of the canton of Vaud
Populated places on Lake Neuchâtel